GamEvac-Combi is a heterologous VSV- and Ad5-vectored Ebola vaccine. There is also a version called GamEvac which is a homologous Ad5-vectored vaccine. GamEvac-Combi was developed by Gamaleya Research Institute of Epidemiology and Microbiology.  the vaccine has been licensed in Russia for emergency use, on the basis of Phase 1 and Phase 2 clinical trials.

Description 
The vaccine consists of live-attenuated recombinant vesicular stomatitis virus (VSV) and adenovirus serotype-5 (Ad5) expressing Ebola envelope glycoprotein. The vaccine is targeted against the Makona variant of Ebola that was circulating in West Africa during the 2013-2016 outbreak.

History 
GamEvac-Combi was licensed by the Ministry of Health of the Russian Federation for emergency use in the territory of the Russian Federation in December 2015. The emergency license was based on Phase I and II clinical data of safety and immunogenicity.

See also 
 Gam-COVID-Vac

References 

Vaccines
Science and technology in Russia
Ebola
Gamaleya Research Institute of Epidemiology and Microbiology